= Kotla Adeeb Shaheed railway station =

Railway station in Pakistan

General information
- Owner: Ministry of Railways

Other information
- Station code: KASD

History
- Former names: Great Indian Peninsula Railway
Location

Kotla Adeeb Shaheed railway station (Urdu: کوٹلہ ادیب شہید ریلوے اسٹیشن) is an abandoned railway station located in Punjab Pakistan.

== See also ==
- List of railway stations in Pakistan
- Pakistan Railways
